Timur Valerievich Ganiev (born 24 October 1975) is an Uzbekistani former professional tennis player.

Born in Tashkent, Ganiev played in two Davis Cup ties for the Uzbekistan team in 1994. He featured in the singles main draw of the 1998 President's Cup and was beaten in the first round by Marat Safin, who was seeded sixth.

ITF Futures finals

Doubles: 1 (0–1)

References

External links
 
 
 

1975 births
Living people
Uzbekistani male tennis players
Sportspeople from Tashkent
20th-century Uzbekistani people
21st-century Uzbekistani people